Thomas W. Fowler (born June 10, 1951) is an American bass guitarist and musician. Born in Salt Lake City, Utah, he has played with It's a Beautiful Day, Frank Zappa, The Mothers of Invention, Jean-Luc Ponty, Ray Charles, Steve Hackett, and many others. His brother Bruce Fowler played trombone in The Mothers (as in the album Roxy & Elsewhere) and his other brother Walt was also a horn player for Zappa.

He also recorded albums with Air Pocket, a band including his siblings among others.

Discography

With It's A Beautiful Day
 Choice Quality Stuff/Anytime - 1971
 At Carnegie Hall - 1972

With Frank Zappa/The Mothers Of Invention
 Over-Nite Sensation - 1973
 Apostrophe (') - 1974
 Roxy & Elsewhere - 1974
 One Size Fits All - 1975
 Bongo Fury - 1975
 Studio Tan - 1978
 The Old Masters Box III - 1987
 You Can't Do That on Stage Anymore, Vol. 2 - 1988
 The Lost Episodes - 1996
 Läther - 1996
 Frank Zappa Plays The Music Of Frank Zappa: A Memorial Tribute - 1996
 Have I Offended Someone? - 1997
 Quadiophiliac - 2004
 One Shot Deal - 2008
 Understanding America - 2012
 Road Tapes, Venue 2 - 2013
 Roxy by Proxy - 2014
 Roxy the Soundtrack - 2015
 The Crux of the Biscuit - 2016
 The Roxy Performances - 2018
 Zappa / Erie - 2022

With Air Pocket/The Fowler Brothers
 Fly On - 1975
 Hunter - 1985
 Breakfast For Dinosaurs - 1988

With George Duke
 I Love the Blues, She Heard My Cry - 1975

With Jean-Luc Ponty
 Aurora - 1976
 Imaginary Voyage - 1976

With Steve Hackett
 Please Don't Touch! - 1978

With Bruce Fowler
 Ants Can Count - 1990

With Steve Fowler
 Last Blue Sky - 1991

With Don Preston
 Vial Foamy Ectoplasm - 1993

With Ray Charles
 Ray Charles At The Olympia - 2004
 Ray - 2004
 Genius Loves Company - 2004

With Tom Fowler Interface
 Let's Start Over - 2011

References

External links
Info at united-mutations.com

American rock bass guitarists
American male bass guitarists
American double-bassists
Male double-bassists
1951 births
Living people
Musicians from Salt Lake City
The Mothers of Invention members
Guitarists from Utah
20th-century American bass guitarists
21st-century double-bassists
Air Pocket (band) members